The 1923 SMU Mustangs football team represented Southern Methodist University (SMU) as a member of the Southwest Conference (SWC) during the 1923 college football season. Led by co-head coaches Ray Morrison and Ewing Y. Freeland, the Mustangs compiled and overall record of 9–0 with a mark of 5–0 in conference play, winning the SWC title.

Schedule

References

SMU
SMU Mustangs football seasons
Southwest Conference football champion seasons
College football undefeated seasons
SMU Mustangs football